Frederick L. Coolidge is an American psychologist known for his work in cognitive archaeology. He has been a Professor of Psychology at the University of Colorado, Colorado Springs since 1979. With Karenleigh A. Overmann, he currently co-directs the Center for Cognitive Archaeology at the University of Colorado, Colorado Springs. He also teaches for the Centre for Cognitive and Brain Sciences at the Indian Institute of Technology Gandhinagar, India.

Education 
Coolidge completed his doctorate in psychology in 1974 at the University of Florida, followed by a clinical internship (1974–1975) and postdoctoral fellowship (1975–1976) in clinical neuropsychology at Shands Teaching Hospital, University of Florida.

Research 

Often in collaboration with archaeologist Thomas G. Wynn, Coolidge has published more than 50+ articles and book chapters in cognitive archaeology. He has also published more than 140+ articles in psychological research, including personality assessment and behavior genetics. With his colleague Thomas Wynn, Coolidge developed the "Enhanced Working Memory Hypothesis", the idea that small but heritable changes in working memory and other executive functions were critical to human cognitive evolution. Coolidge and Wynn have also collaborated on Neandertal cognition, cognitive differences between Neandertals and contemporary Homo sapiens, technical cognition, and creativity. In 2008, Coolidge co-chaired the 139th Numbered Wenner-Gren Symposium with Wynn. Entitled "Working Memory: Beyond Language and Symbolism," the proceedings were published as a special issue of Current Anthropology. In 2011, he and Wynn established the Center for Cognitive Archaeology at the University of Colorado, Colorado Springs.

Honors 
 In 1987, 1992, and 2005, Coolidge was awarded Fulbright Fellowships for work in India.
 In 1990, Coolidge was designated as a University of Colorado Presidential Teaching Scholar.
 In 2005, Coolidge received the UCCS Letters, Arts and Sciences Annual Outstanding Research and Creative Works Award.
 In 2007, Coolidge received the UCCS Annual Faculty Award for Excellence in Research.
 In 2015, Coolidge was appointed Senior Visiting Scholar at Keble College, University of Oxford.
 In 2020, Coolidge was appointed Guest Professor at the Indian Institute of Technology Gandhinagar, India.

Enhanced Working Memory Hypothesis (EWMH) 

The Enhanced Working Memory Hypothesis (EWMH) proposes that a small but heritable change in executive functioning may have been the reason why Homo sapiens persisted and flourished, while cousin species like the Neandertals went extinct. Executive functions are the higher-level cognitive skills used to control and coordinate other abilities and behaviors; they consist of the abilities to make decisions, plan, strategize, organize, inhibit behavior, and temporally sequence events. The EWMH was inspired, in part, by Coolidge’s reaction to an article by paleoanthropologist Ian Tattersall that had suggested the between-species difference related to language. From his work in behavior genetics, Coolidge understood the heritability of the executive functions and surmised that possible differences in the executive functioning of the two human species had perhaps enabled Homo sapiens to outcompete the Neandertals. He proposed the idea to his colleague, archaeologist Thomas Wynn, resulting in a collaboration to operationalize executive functions so they could be detected in the archaeological record, as for example, resourcing strategies like traps suggest the involvement of executive functions like planning and inhibition because they involve significant amounts of time between an action (building and setting a trap) and its reward (harvesting prey). Coolidge and Wynn have focused in particular on the executive function Working Memory, expanding on the classic model by psychologist Alan Baddeley and examining signs of change in Working Memory in the archaeological record and its effects in domains like technical cognition and creativity.

Selected works in cognitive archaeology and cognitive evolution

Authored books

Edited volumes

Articles

Book chapters

Authored books in other subjects

References

External links
University of Colorado, Colorado Springs Center for Cognitive Archaeology
Frederick L. Coolidge, Psychology Today

See also
 

Living people
University of Florida alumni
American cognitive scientists
Year of birth missing (living people)
University of Colorado Colorado Springs faculty